Twice is a novel by bestselling author Lisa Unger writing as Lisa Miscione. It is the third book featuring Lydia Strong.

References

2004 American novels
American crime novels
Novels set in New York City
Novels by Lisa Unger
Minotaur Books books